Live is a live album by bassist Sirone, recorded in November, 1980, at The Public Theater in New York City. It was initially released in 1981 on Sirone's label Serious Music, and was reissued in 2005 by Atavistic Records as part of their Unheard Music Series. On the album, Sirone is joined by saxophonist Claude Lawrence and drummer Dennis Charles.

Reception

The editors of AllMusic awarded the album 5 stars. Reviewer Michael G. Nastos called it "potent, creative music."

The authors of the Penguin Guide to Jazz Recordings wrote: "Sirone's deep, bluesy tone and background in horn-playing are evident... Charles and Lawrence are largely present to set up ideas and improvising contexts... it's his bass playing that is most revelatory, rich and resonant sounds and some nimbly inventive ideas."

Writing for All About Jazz, John Eyles commented: "Live is both a valuable historical snapshot and a curate's egg of an album, very good in parts." Regarding "Eyes of the Wind," he stated: "Sirone has been quoted as saying, 'The music has been abused by that word 'free.' Sometimes you get a lot of noise.' This track is a powerful antidote to that tendency: noisy or anarchic it isn't... Free it may be, but it does not sacrifice musicality or logic as a result." He concluded: "Overall, this album makes a very welcome return to Sirone's catalogue."

Track listing

 "Flute Song" (Sirone) – 10:00
 "Eyes of the Wind" (Lawrence/Charles) – 11:00
 "The Journey" (Sirone) – 6:00
 "When It's Over" (Lawrence/Sirone) – 7:40
 "Vision" (Sirone) – 8:30

Personnel 
 Claude Lawrence – alto saxophone
 Sirone – bass, wood flute, trombone
 Dennis Charles – drums

References

2005 live albums
Live jazz albums
Sirone (musician) live albums
Atavistic Records live albums